David Nedjate Mehmet (born  2 December 1960) is an English former professional footballer. His clubs included Millwall, Charlton Athletic, and Gillingham, where he made over 130 Football League appearances. He went on to play for a large number of non-league clubs and was still playing in the Kent County League at the age of 40.  In 2008, he was appointed manager of Fisher Athletic.

References

1960 births
Living people
Footballers from Camberwell
Association football midfielders
English footballers
Millwall F.C. players
Tampa Bay Rowdies (1975–1993) players
Charlton Athletic F.C. players
Gillingham F.C. players
Fisher Athletic F.C. players
Maidstone United F.C. (1897) players
Alma Swanley F.C. players
Barnet F.C. players
Enfield F.C. players
Erith & Belvedere F.C. players
Bromley F.C. players
Greenwich Borough F.C. players
English Football League players
North American Soccer League (1968–1984) players
English people of Turkish Cypriot descent
Sportspeople of Turkish Cypriot descent
English football managers
Fisher Athletic F.C. managers
Croydon F.C. managers
Beckenham Town F.C. managers
English expatriate sportspeople in the United States
Expatriate soccer players in the United States
English expatriate footballers